Ix Ekʼ Naah ("Lady Star House"), also known as the Snake Lady of Palenque, was a Maya queen of the Kaan kingdom in Campeche. She was a daughter of Lady Bʼakabʼ, wife of the King Tuun Kʼabʼ Hix and had a daughter who married one lord, Prince of La Corona.

See also 
Women in Maya society
Maya rulers

References

Maya queens
Mexican nobility
6th-century births
6th-century deaths
6th-century women